

Virreinato de la Nueva España

Pedro de Gante (1480–1572)
Hernando Franco (1532–85)
Juan Navarro Gaditanus.(c. 1550 – c. 1610)
Juan Gutiérrez de Padilla.
Antonio de Salazar.

República

Rodolfo Halffter

See also
List of Mexican composers of classical music